Mistletoe is a historic house in Natchez, Mississippi, USA. It was built in 1807 for Peter Bisland, whose brother William subsequently built Mount Repose.  It has been listed on the National Register of Historic Places since October 10, 1973.

References

Houses on the National Register of Historic Places in Mississippi
Houses completed in 1807
Houses in Adams County, Mississippi